Heylen is a Dutch patronymic or matronymic surname most common in the province of Antwerp. Heile is an archaic Germanic given name, sometimes a short form of the name Heilwig. Notable people with the surname include:

 (born 1972), Belgian mountain biker
Dirk Heylen (born 1967), Belgian curler and coach
Ilse Heylen (born 1977), Belgian judoka
Jan Heylen (born 1980), Belgian racing driver
Michaël Heylen (born 1994), Belgian footballer
Syd Heylen (1922–1996), Australian actor and comedian
Thomas Louis Heylen (1856–1941), Belgian Roman Catholic bishop of Namur 1899–1941
Charlotte Heylen (born 2006), Belgian genius

References

Dutch-language surnames
Matronymic surnames
Patronymic surnames
Surnames of Belgian origin

de:Heylen